The 1971 UCI Track Cycling World Championships were the World Championship for track cycling. They took place in Varese, Italy in 1971. Eleven events were contested, 9 for men (3 for professionals, 6 for amateurs) and 2 for women.

Medal summary

Medal table

See also
 1971 UCI Road World Championships

References

Uci Track Cycling World Championships, 1971
Track cycling
UCI Track Cycling World Championships by year
International cycle races hosted by Italy